The American Legion Memorial Bridge, also known as the American Legion Bridge and formerly as the Cabin John Bridge,  is a bridge carrying Interstate 495 (Capital Beltway) across the Potomac River between Montgomery County, Maryland and Fairfax County, Virginia in the United States. It is an American Water Landmark. Plummers Island is located immediately downstream of the bridge.

The bridge has five traffic lanes in each direction. The outermost lane in each direction is an entrance/exit-only lane for traffic to/from the Clara Barton Parkway in Maryland and the George Washington Memorial Parkway and Georgetown Pike (State Route 193) in Virginia. There are no facilities for pedestrians or cyclists, which are prohibited.

History

Opened on December 31, 1962, the bridge was originally named the "Cabin John Bridge" because of its proximity to the community of Cabin John on the Maryland side of the Potomac River. The bridge opened without a ceremony due to the cold weather. On May 30, 1969, the bridge was officially renamed the "American Legion Memorial Bridge" in a ceremony led by Lt. Gen. Lewis B. Hershey, director of the U.S. Selective Service System. This action reduced confusion with the Union Arch Bridge, which carries the Washington Aqueduct and MacArthur Boulevard across Cabin John Creek and which some people also called "the Cabin John Bridge". The bridge was widened from its original 6-lane configuration to the current 10-lane version by 1992 via a third span filling the median between what was originally two separate spans.

The American Legion Memorial Bridge is an important commuter route because of its proximity to edge cities and high tech centers in Maryland and Virginia. It is the only high volume crossing between Montgomery County, Maryland and Fairfax County, Virginia, the most populous counties in their respective states. Congestion on the American Legion Bridge and commuter travel between the western Washington suburbs in both states has fueled support for a western bridge around the Loudoun County/Fairfax County line in Virginia (Virginia Route 28/Fairfax County Parkway area), or farther out as part of the Western Transportation Corridor. Opponents claim that another bridge would increase development in those areas, increase traffic, and generate more pollution in the Chesapeake Bay.
The bridge crosses the western terminus of the Potomac Heritage Trail and the George Washington Memorial Parkway on the Virginian side of the Potomac River. On the Maryland side, the bridge crosses over MacArthur Boulevard, the Clara Barton Parkway and the Chesapeake and Ohio Canal. Lock 13 (Seven Locks 6) of the canal is underneath the bridge.

The American Legion Memorial Bridge is one of the two locations at which the Capital Beltway crosses the Potomac River; the other is the Woodrow Wilson Memorial Bridge.

American Legion Bridge expansion 
In September 2017, Maryland Governor Larry Hogan announced plans to widen interstate highways I-270 and I-495 (Capital Beltway) with toll-funded express lanes planned, built, and operated through a public–private partnership (P3). It was announced on November 12, 2019, that the existing spans will be rebuilt and replaced with a new structure expanding capacity from eight to twelve lanes.

On July 10, 2020, the Maryland Department of Transportation (MDOT) released its more than 18,000-page Draft Environmental Impact Statement (DEIS) on the project, which addresses the construction project's impacts on people and the environment.

The expansion project would destroy large parts of Plummers Island, which is located immediately downstream of the bridge. It would destroy or require relocation of the channel that separates the island from the mainland, clear-cut trees, and level a significant portion of the island. The native beech forest on the mainland side would also have to be cut down; wetlands between the mainland and the island would be destroyed, which can lead to a heavy infestation with invasive plants.

In August 2022 the Federal Highway Administration approved the proposed project. In October 2022 environmental and historic preservation groups filed suit against the state, citing deficiencies in the environmental review process and the projected impacts on Plummers Island. In November 2022 MDOT announced that it would not award a contract for construction of the proposed expansion project until after Governor Hogan has left office in January 2023. Decisions on the project will be made by the administration of newly-elected Governor Wes Moore and the Maryland Board of Public Works.

See also
 
 
 
 
 List of crossings of the Potomac River

References

Further reading

External links

 
 Map and satellite image from Eyeball series

Cabin John, Maryland
Interstate 95
Bridges over the Potomac River
Bridges in Montgomery County, Maryland
Bridges completed in 1962
Transportation in Fairfax County, Virginia
McLean, Virginia
Monuments and memorials in Virginia
Road bridges in Maryland
Road bridges in Virginia
Bridges on the Interstate Highway System
Potomac, Maryland
Interstate vehicle bridges in the United States